2016 World Cup may refer to:

2016 FIFA Futsal World Cup
2016 FIFA Club World Cup
2016 FIFA U-20 Women's World Cup
2016 FIFA U-17 Women's World Cup
2016 FINA Diving World Cup
2016 FINA Swimming World Cup
2016 Alpine Skiing World Cup
2016 Canoe Slalom World Cup
2016 ICC World Twenty20
2016 World Cup of Hockey
2016 World Cup of Golf

See also
 2016 World Championship (disambiguation)